Vladi or Vlady may refer to the following people:

Vladi Vargas (born 1971), Swedish music producer
Vlady Kibalchich Rusakov (1920–2005), Russian-Mexican painter
Vlady (musician), an Argentine musician and film score composer of the 1950s
Marina Vlady (born 1938), French actress

See also
 Vladimir Guerrero (born 1975), retired Major League Baseball player nicknamed "Vladdy"
 Vladimir Guerrero Jr. (born 1999), Major League Baseball player nicknamed "Vladdy" and "Vladdy Jr.", son of the above

Lists of people by nickname